Mumbai Football Association (MFA), formerly known as Mumbai District Football Association (MDFA), is an organisation that governs the football in and around the Indian city of Mumbai. It is a member of the Western India Football Association, which is affiliated to the All India Football Federation (AIFF). The MFA organises Mumbai Football League, overlooking promotion and development of football in the bustling city of Mumbai.

History
The Mumbai Football Association (MFA), which is a non-profit organization, was established in 1983 and is the official district body for development, conduct and organization of football in the city of Mumbai and its suburbs. The MFA is affiliated with the Western India Football Association (WIFA), a state association of Maharashtra. From a beginning of 57 football clubs affiliated to it, the association now caters to and conducts football activity for more than 10,000 players.

Mumbai had always been a center of football on the western coast of India from since the British rule. After the foundation of Western India Football Association as a result of the merger between Bombay Football Association and Bombay Rovers Cup Committee in 1911, it conducted the Harwood Football League and the prestigious Rovers Cup, an all India tournament, which has come as a legacy to MFA.

The MFA is managed by the Executive Council consisting of a president, 4 vice presidents, general secretary, treasurer, 4 assistant secretaries and 15 committee members. In addition to these, six members whose services would be beneficial to the association are also co-opted on the executive committee. The term of the executive Council is four years.

Olympians and internationals of MFA
Mumbai has produced a number of olympians and international players of high repute, who have proudly represented our country with excellence. Double olympian S. S. Narayan was the vice-president of MFA.   Olympians Sanjeeva Uchil and Fortunato Franco also hail from Mumbai.
Many international players have been produced under the aegis of MFA. They are Mario Gracious, Bandya Kakade, Derek D'Souza, Ranjit Thapa, Amar Bahadur, Yusuf Ansari, Godfrey Pereira, Khalid Jamil, Henry Menezes, Akhil Ansari, Bernard Pereira, Arthur Pereira, Santosh Kashyap, Steven Dias and Abhishek Yadav ,to name a few.

Mumbai football pyramid

Men
Mumbai Football League
 Elite Division
 Super Division
 First Division
 Second Division
 Third Division

Women
 MFA Women’s League
 Girls U-17
 Girls U-14

Youth
 U-18 Boys
 U-16 Boys Division I
 U-16 Boys Division II 
 U-14 Boys Division I                     
 U-14 Boys Division II
 U-12 Boys
 U-10 Boys
 U-8 Boys

Knockout tournaments

Men's

Football grounds
MFA conducts their events on the following grounds.

References

Football governing bodies in India
Football in Mumbai
Football in Maharashtra
Organisations based in Mumbai
1983 establishments in Maharashtra
Sports organizations established in 1983